The Cuyahoga County Juvenile Detention Center (CCJDC) is a youth detention center located in Cleveland, Ohio. It is accredited by the American Correctional Association Commission on Accreditation for Corrections. Its average daily population in 2007 was 163 residents, a condition which was described as overcrowded.

CCJDC is the oldest detention center for youths in the United States. It was designed by the Frank W. Bail Co. and opened in December 1931. It was considered a national and international model of court services for children. It is located on the corner of East 22nd Street and Central Avenue in downtown Cleveland. A new nine-story juvenile justice center on Quincy Avenue at East 93rd Street was constructed and opened in 2011. At that time the CCJDC building will be considered surplus by the county. It could be sold, or it could be torn down to make room for a new freeway exit ramp. However, the Ohio Department of Transportation has stated that the building is potentially historic and should not be demolished. The building has been designated a landmark by the City of Cleveland, and it is considered eligible for listing on the National Register of Historic Places.

In February 2010, three inmates escaped through a kitchen. Two of the inmates were found later that day, the third was captured 4 days later.

References

Government buildings completed in 1931
Buildings and structures in Cleveland
Fairfax, Cleveland
History of Cleveland
Juvenile detention centers in the United States
1931 establishments in Ohio